Karine Brémond (born 17 June 1975) is a retired French swimmer who won a bronze medal in the 200 m breaststroke at the 2000 European Aquatics Championships. She competed at the 1996 and 2000 Summer Olympics in the 4×100 m medley relay and 100 m and 200 m breaststroke events, but did not reach the finals.

References

1975 births
Living people
Swimmers at the 1996 Summer Olympics
Swimmers at the 2000 Summer Olympics
Olympic swimmers of France
French female breaststroke swimmers
European Aquatics Championships medalists in swimming
20th-century French women
21st-century French women